Norbert Brainin, OBE (12 March 1923 in Vienna – 10 April 2005 in London) was the first violinist of the Amadeus Quartet, one of the world's most highly regarded string quartets.

Because of Brainin's Jewish origin, he was driven out of Vienna after Hitler's Anschluss of 1938, as were violinist Siegmund Nissel and violist Peter Schidlof. Brainin and Schidlof met in a British internment camp. Like many Jewish refugees they had the misfortune to be confined by the British as "enemy aliens" after reaching the UK. Brainin was released after a few months, but Schidlof remained in the camp, where he met Nissel. Finally Schidlof and Nissel were released, and the three were able to study with violin pedagogue Max Rostal, who taught them free of charge. Brainin won the 1946 Carl Flesch International Violin Competition, which Rostal co-founded.

It was through Rostal that they met cellist Martin Lovett, and in 1947 they formed the Brainin Quartet, which was renamed the Amadeus Quartet in 1948. They became one of the most celebrated quartets of the 20th century; its members were awarded numerous honours, including:

 Officer of the Order of the British Empire, presented by the Queen (1960)
 Doctorates from the Universities of London, York, and Caracas
 The highest of all German awards, the Grand Cross of Merit
 The Austrian Cross of Honour for Science and Art (1974)

The quartet disbanded in 1987 on the death of Schidlof, whom the surviving members considered irreplacable. Brainin continued to perform as a soloist, often with pianists Günter Ludwig and Maureen Jones. In 1992, he performed a benefit concert in Washington, D.C. for then-jailed presidential candidate Lyndon LaRouche.

His instruments included the "Rode" Guarnerius del Gesu of 1734, the "Chaconne" Stradivarius of 1725 and the "Gibson" Stradivarius of 1713.

See also 
 List of British Jewish entertainers

References

External links
 Martin Lovett remembering Norbert Brainin

Jewish classical musicians
Austrian classical violinists
British classical violinists
British male violinists
Jewish emigrants from Austria to the United Kingdom after the Anschluss
Austrian people of Russian descent
Musicians from Vienna
Officers of the Order of the British Empire
Commanders Crosses of the Order of Merit of the Federal Republic of Germany
Recipients of the Austrian Cross of Honour for Science and Art
1923 births
2005 deaths
LaRouche movement
People interned in the Isle of Man during World War II
20th-century classical violinists
Naturalised citizens of the United Kingdom
Male classical violinists
20th-century British male musicians